Hedinichthys macropterus is a species of stone loach in the genus Hedinichthys. It is endemic to the Khesi basin in China. This species reaches a length of

References

macropterus
Freshwater fish of China
Endemic fauna of China
Taxa named by Solomon Herzenstein
Fish described in 1888